Johannes Jurgens Snyman (born 29 March 1989 in Kroonstad, South Africa) is a former South African rugby union player that played for the  and the  between 2010 and 2014. His regular position is hooker.

Career

Youth

He was selected in the ' Under-16 side for the Grant Khomo Week tournament in 2005. In 2006 and 2007, he represented them at Under-18 level at the Craven Week tournaments, also captaining the side in 2007.

He progressed through their age groups, playing for the  side in the 2008 Under-19 Provincial Championship and for the  side in the Under-21 Provincial Championships in 2009 and 2010.

Sharks

Griffons

He didn't play any matches for them in 2013, but returned to action in 2014 by making four appearances in the 2014 Currie Cup qualification tournament as the Griffons failed to qualify for the 2014 Currie Cup Premier Division. Instead, they played in the 2014 Currie Cup First Division competition. Snyman made three appearances to help the Griffons reach the final. However, he was an unused substitute in the final where the Griffons won the match 23–21 to win their first trophy for six years.

He retired from rugby at the end of 2014 to pursue a career in farming.

References

South African rugby union players
Living people
1989 births
People from Kroonstad
Rugby union hookers
Griffons (rugby union) players
Sharks (Currie Cup) players
Rugby union players from the Free State (province)